Beuvillers is the name of several communes in France:

Beuvillers, Calvados
Beuvillers, Meurthe-et-Moselle